Greatest Hits is a compilation album by Cuban-American singer-songwriter Gloria Estefan, released on October 30, 1992, by Epic Records. The album includes songs with soft rock influenced sounds as well as more upbeat Latin pop works inspired by dance music. The tracks were gathered from various releases over the 1985 to 1992 period.

Composition
Although credited solely to Estefan on the front cover, the album serves as a collection of her greatest hits both as a solo artist and as lead singer of Miami Sound Machine, which later became her backing group. The album also contains four previously unreleased songs. The track listing for the US and Canadian album release differs from alternate releases in various regions. Many international releases of the album include the songs "Dr. Beat" and "Bad Boy", though the Australian and New Zealand release replaced "Bad Boy" with "Cuts Both Ways". A limited edition Australian double CD set was later released featuring a special "Megamix", a medley of Estefan's early dance hits. In 2013, the album was re-released in Brazil under the name Seleção Essencial with a new cover, though the track listing remained the same.

Singles
The first single released from the album was "Always Tomorrow". It reached No. 81 on the US Billboard Hot 100 but reached No. 5 on the Adult Contemporary Chart and the top 30 in the UK Singles Chart. The second single, "I See Your Smile" charted higher and reached No. 48 on the Billboard Hot 100 Chart and  No. 3 on the Billboard Adult Contemporary Chart. It also reached  No. 49 in the UK. "Go Away" failed to chart on the Billboard Hot 100 Chart but reached No. 15 on the Billboard Dance Chart and was a UK top 20 hit (No. 13).

The "Megamix" or "Miami Hit Mix" as a double A-side with "Christmas Through Your Eyes" was released internationally and reached No. 8 in Colombia and the UK. Music videos were made for all these singles.

Track listing

Personnel 
Design
 Nancy Donald – art direction
 Daphna Shalev – logo design
 Alberto Tolot – front cover photography (at the Biltmore Hotel, Coral Gables)
 Antoine Verglas – inside booklet photography (at the Raleigh Hotel, Miami Beach)
 Roberto Trovati – stylist
 Serena Radaelli – hair
 Paco – hair (for Gessner & Camp)
 Francesca Tolot – makeup
 Eric Barnard – makeup

Charts

Weekly charts

Year-end charts

Certifications and sales

References

1992 greatest hits albums
Gloria Estefan compilation albums
Albums produced by Emilio Estefan
Epic Records compilation albums